Anaches dorsalis is a species of beetle in the family Cerambycidae. It was described by Francis Polkinghorne Pascoe in 1858. It is found in areas of India, China, Thailand, Laos, Nepal, and Vietnam.

References

Pteropliini
Beetles described in 1858